The 57th Battalion (Canadien-Français), CEF (in French, 57e Bataillon (Canadien-Français), CEF) was an infantry battalion of the Canadian Expeditionary Force during the Great War. The 57th Battalion was authorized on 20 April 1915 and embarked for Britain on 2 June 1916. On 8 June 1916, its personnel were absorbed by the 69th Battalion, CEF to provide reinforcements to the Canadian Corps in the field. The battalion was disbanded on 11 April 1918.

The 57th Battalion recruited in and was mobilized at Quebec City.

The 57th Battalion had two Officers Commanding:

Maj. A.L.H. Renaud
Lt.-Col. E.T. Paquette

The 57th Battalion was awarded the battle honour THE GREAT WAR 1916.

The 57e Bataillon (Canadien-Français), CEF is perpetuated by  Les Voltigeurs de Quebec .

References

Sources
Canadian Expeditionary Force 1914-1919 by Col. G.W.L. Nicholson, CD, Queen's Printer, Ottawa, Ontario, 1962

057
Military units and formations of Quebec
Les Voltigeurs de Québec